Dave Clarke (born 1971 in Kilmallock, County Limerick) is a retired Irish sportsperson.  He played hurling with his local club Kilmallock and was a member of the Limerick senior inter-county team in the 1990s and 2000s.

References

1971 births
Living people
Kilmallock hurlers
Limerick inter-county hurlers
Munster inter-provincial hurlers
Sportspeople from County Limerick